Peter Gross is an American comic book writer and artist known for such works as The Books of Magic, Lucifer and The Unwritten.

Biography
Gross attended St. John's University and did graduate studies at the University of Wisconsin-Superior. He intended to make a living as a fine artist, but was drawn into comics, first doing some work for Marvel and then following it up with his originally-self-published series Empire Lanes.

Bibliography
Comics work includes:

 The Books of Magic #4, 6–8, 18–19, 21–30, 39–41, 43–62, 64–75 (art and (from #51) script, with writer John Ney Rieber, ongoing series Vertigo, August 1994 – August 2000)
 Lucifer #5–8, 10–13, 15–19, 21–23, 25–27, 29–32, 34–40, 42–44, 46–49, 51–54, 56–57, 59–61, 63–65, 67–69, 71–72, 74–75 (with writer Mike Carey, ongoing series, Vertigo, October 2000 – August 2006) collected as:
 Volume 2 Children and Monsters (collects Lucifer #5–13, Vertigo, 2001)
 Volume 3 A Dalliance with the Damned (collects Lucifer #14–20, Vertigo, 2002)
 Volume 4 The Divine Comedy (collects Lucifer #21–28, Vertigo, 2003)
 Volume 5 Inferno (collects Lucifer #29–35, Vertigo, 2004)
 Volume 6 Mansions of the Silence (collects Lucifer #36–41, Vertigo, 2004)
 Volume 7 Exodus (collects Lucifer' #42–44 & #46–49, Vertigo, 2005)
 Volume 8 The Wolf Beneath the Tree (collects Lucifer #45 & #50–54, Vertigo, 2005)
 Volume 9 Crux (collects Lucifer #55–61, Vertigo, 2006)
 Volume 10 Morningstar (collects Lucifer #62–69, Vertigo, 2006)
 Volume 11 Evensong (collects Lucifer #70–75, Vertigo, 2007)Chosen (with writer Mark Millar, 3-issue mini-series, Dark Horse Comics, 2004, tpb, Image Comics, 72 pages, December 2008)The Unwritten'' (with Mike Carey, ongoing series, Vertigo, July 2009- 2015)

Notes

References

External links

Peter Gross Art

Living people
People from St. Cloud, Minnesota
University of Wisconsin–Superior alumni
1958 births